Sky Sports Football Quiz Season 02 is a 2002 football quiz video game released for the PlayStation and PC platforms. The game was developed by Hothouse Creations and published by THQ. The game is a follow up to Sky Sports Football Quiz and features television presenter Kirsty Gallacher.

Gameplay
Just like its predecessor, Sky Sports Football Quiz Season 02 is a quiz game that tests the player's knowledge of football.

The player is able to choose between four modes; Penalty Shootout, where the player has to answer questions correctly to score goals, Man of the Match where the player/players take turns attacking and defending by answering questions, League Championship, where the player plays the game throughout an entire football season and Dream Team.

Reception
Steve Hill of PC Zone gave the title a score of 50/100, describing it as a "rehash" of the previous game in the series, albeit with a refreshed set of questions. Official PlayStation Magazine labelled the game as a "top quizzer that's great with mates", awarding a score of 7/10, but cautioned that "only footie fans should bother".

References

2002 video games
Europe-exclusive video games
PlayStation (console) games
Quiz video games
THQ games
Video games developed in the United Kingdom
Windows games
Hothouse Creations games